Ernest Hemingway (1899-1961) was an American writer and journalist.

Hemingway may also refer to:
Hemingway (surname), a surname and list of people with that name
Hemingway (comics), a Marvel Comics character
Hemingway, South Carolina
3656 Hemingway, an asteroid
Hemingway: On the Edge, a play by Ed Metzger and Laya Gelff-Metzger
"Hemingway", a song by Bløf
Hemingway, a 1988 television mini-series starring Stacy Keach
Hemingway, a bulldog owned by Pete Wentz featured in the video "The Take Over, the Breaks Over"
 Hemingway (crater), a crater on Mercury
Hemingway (film), a 2021 PBS documentary starring Jeff Daniels

See also
 Hemingway Foundation/PEN Award, literary award
 Ernest Hemingway Cottage, on Walloon Lake, Michigan
 Ernest Hemingway House, Key West, Florida
 Hemingway Corner, Canadian-American folk pop group of the 1960s
 Hemingway cat, slang term for polydactyl cats
 Hemingway Daiquiri or Hemingway Special, a variety of Daiquiri